Harriot (or Harriet) was launched at Broadstairs in 1803. She made four voyages as a Guineaman (slave ship) between 1804 and 1807. Following the prohibition in 1807 on British vessels participating in the trans-Atlantic slave trade Harriet became a West Indiaman. A French privateer captured Harriet as Harriet was returning to England from Port au Prince in April 1809.

Career
Harriot first appeared in Lloyd's Register in 1804.

1st slave voyage (1804): Captain James Clark acquired a letter of marque on 21 January 1804. He sailed from London on 2 February. Harriot gathered her slaves on the Gold Coast. She arrived at Suriname on 27 June 1804 with 260 slaves. She sailed from Suriname on 13 August and arrived back in London on 29 September. 

2nd slave voyage (1804–1805): Captain Stewart Sutherland sailed from London on 3 December 1804. She acquired her slaves at Accra and arrived at Demerara on 20 June 1805 with 273. She left Demerara on 24 July. At Demerara she had taken on part of the cargo of Rose, Mansfield, master. Rose had run aground and been condemned. Harriet brought her portion of the cargo to England. Harriot arrived back in London on 30 September. 

3rd slave voyage (1806–1807): Captain James Clark acquired a letter of marque on 11 January 1806. He sailed from London on 22 January. Harriot acquired her slaves at Accra and Wiamba and arrived at Demerara on 9 July with 275 slaves. As Harriet was on her way back to England from Demerara, she ran onshore at Grenada and had to unload her cargo. Harriot arrived back in London on 27 January 1807.

4th slave voyage (1807–1808): The Act for the abolition of the slave trade had passed Parliament in March 1807 and took effect on 1 May 1807. However, Captain Mitchelson Harriot sailed from London on 23 March 1807, well before the deadline. Harriot acquired her slaves at Accra. She arrived at Barbados on 24 December with 255 slaves; there she landed 63. At some point Captain Jacob Williamson replaced Mitchelson. Harriot sailed on to Demerara with the remaining slaves. She arrived back in London on 24 June 1808.

Fate
She had sailed from Port-au-Prince on 4 March in company with Harriet, Clarke, master. They had parted on 20 April. 

As Harriet was returning from Port-au-Prince in April, the French privateer Rodeur captured her and took her into Bayonne. The "English ship, of 280 tons, Coppered and Armed with 14 guns (14-pounders)," was carrying a valuable cargo of coffee and other goods. Rodeur took Harriet into Bayonne.

Notes and citations
Notes

Citations

1803 ships
Ships built in England
Age of Sail merchant ships of England
London slave ships
Captured ships